Zîmbreni is a commune in Ialoveni District, Moldova. It is composed of two villages, Găureni and Zîmbreni.

References

Communes of Ialoveni District